Mr. Jones Has a Card Party is a 1909 American silent short comedy film directed by D. W. Griffith. A print of the film exists.

Cast
 John R. Cumpson as Mr. Jones
 Florence Lawrence as Mrs. Jones
 Linda Arvidson as The Maid
 Flora Finch as Guest
 Robert Harron as A Messenger
 Anita Hendrie as Guest
 Charles Inslee as Guest
 Arthur V. Johnson as Guest
 Jeanie MacPherson as Guest
 Mack Sennett as Guest
 Harry Solter as Guest

References

External links
 

1909 films
1909 comedy films
1909 short films
Silent American comedy films
American silent short films
American black-and-white films
Films directed by D. W. Griffith
American comedy short films
Films with screenplays by Frank E. Woods
1900s American films